Mario Flores can refer to:

 Mario Flores (Peruvian footballer) (born 1973), Peruvian footballer
 Mario Flores (Salvadoran footballer) (born 1943), Salvadoran footballer